Alexa Carole Havins (born November 16, 1980) is an American actress. She first came to prominence in 2003, when she became the originating actress in the role of Babe Carey Chandler on the soap opera All My Children.  Her role as the flawed but good Babe Carey earned her a Daytime Emmy Award nomination in 2005 and recognition as being half of one of the show's most popular soap opera pairings.

Havins has made guest appearances in a number of television shows, as well as a number of independent films. In 2011, she joined the main cast for Torchwood's fourth series, Torchwood: Miracle Day, airing on BBC Worldwide and US premium television network Starz.

Early life
Alexa Havins was born in Artesia, New Mexico on November 16, 1980. As a child and adolescent, she was raised in Chandler, Arizona, later attending Chandler High School. Coincidentally, her mother often called her Babe. Her childhood nickname was the "Ice Maiden" because she was "deathly shy".

Havins was first introduced to entertainment at age 3 when she discovered dancing. At the age of five, she was already performing professionally with a jazz ensemble. However, it was not until she was discovered by renowned acting coach, Jean Fowler, who encouraged her move to New York City, that she began to turn her talent into a professional career. There, she attended the prestigious Circle in the Square Theatre School, where her love for acting would develop. While in Los Angeles, California, Havins met and studied closely under the legendary acting coach Brian Reise. The two have remained close friends, and he continues to be a mentor to her to this day.

Career
Before her role as Babe Carey Chandler on All My Children, Havins was a professional dancer. She changed her focus to acting, carrying a principle with her: "Always hold on to your morals and values because this business can be very deceiving. I turned down a lot of things because there was nudity required," she said.

During her time on the series, Havins earned a Daytime Emmy nomination for Outstanding Younger Actress in a Drama Series and a Soap Opera Digest Award for Outstanding Younger Lead Actress. In a baby switch storyline set into motion by two shows, All My Children and One Life to Live, she portrayed the character on One Life to Live as well. 
 
Other acting compliments include her character's romantic pairing with Jacob Young's JR Chandler, often cited for their romantic chemistry. "The on-screen chemistry she shares with Emmy-winning co-star Jacob Young is simply sizzling and truly magnetizing," stated soap opera site Soapcentral. The two actors' dynamic as the pair made their characters well known in the top ten couples lists for one of today's most popular soap opera couples.

While still on contract with All My Children, Havins appeared in films Joe Killionaire, the 2004 horror-comedy by writer-director Sean Morton, Tracy Michele Tabb's 26-minute 2005 romantic comedy First Kiss, Travis Betz's 2006 horror Joshua, and Ash Christian's original off-beat 2006 comedy feature Fat Girls.

In addition, Havins guest-starred in a June 2006 episode of FX's critically praised series Rescue Me, as well as guest-starred on the pilot episode of On and Off, though this series was never aired.

On stage, Havins received credit in a production of Tennessee Williams' The Glass Menagerie, where she portrayed Laura, the painfully shy girl who has a troubled relationship with her aging mother. She also portrayed the lead role of 12-year-old tomboy Frankie Addams, in the stage version of Carson McCullers' 1946 novel The Member of the Wedding. Another project for Havins was the film Brooklyn Rules, a mob drama by Michael Corrente set in 1985 Brooklyn, which had a limited release on May 18, 2007, starring Alec Baldwin, Freddie Prinze, Jr., Mena Suvari and Scott Caan. Havins was later busy with filming in Keith Schwebel's low-budget indie flick titled Desert Fox.

On September 4, 2007, it was confirmed by Soap Opera Digest that Havins would be leaving All My Children and that actress Amanda Baker would be taking over the role. Havins departed the show on October 8, 2007, to pursue other acting ventures.

In 2008, Havins appeared in the film 27 Dresses, starring Katherine Heigl of Grey's Anatomy fame. Havins portrayed a bride. She also appeared in the film Old Dogs.

In 2011, Havins joined John Barrowman, Eve Myles and Mekhi Phifer as part of the main cast for Torchwood's fourth series, Torchwood: Miracle Day, airing on BBC Worldwide and US premium television network Starz. She portrays character Esther Drummond, "an innocent, in a world of assassins, liars and zealots". She also filmed guest spots on CSI: NY and Grey's Anatomy. In July 2011 it was confirmed that Havins will return for several episodes of All My Children to be broadcast later in the year.

Personal life
Havins is good friends with her former on-screen mother Bobbie Eakes. Since June 5, 2005, Havins has been married to her former All My Children co-star Justin Bruening. Bruening, who portrayed Jamie Martin, proposed to Havins following the taping of a scene where the character of Jamie proposes to Babe.  After husband Bruening left All My Children, Havins exited as well shortly after and the couple moved to Los Angeles. On August 10, 2010, she and Bruening welcomed their first child, daughter Lexington Grace Bruening. Alexa and Justin also have two more children.

Filmography

Film

Television

Awards and nominations

See also
 JR Chandler and Babe Carey

References

External links

1980 births
Actresses from New Mexico
American film actresses
American soap opera actresses
American stage actresses
American television actresses
Living people
People from Artesia, New Mexico
People from Chandler, Arizona
21st-century American women